James Macnaghten McGarel Hogg, 1st Baron Magheramorne, KCB (3 May 1823 – 27 June 1890), was a British politician, Member of Parliament, and local government leader.

Early life
Hogg was born into an Ulster-Scots family, being the son of Sir James Weir Hogg, Bt., the Administrator-General of Bengal and Chairman of the British East India Company, and was born in Calcutta. His surname at birth was merely Hogg, but he added the surname McGarel on 8 February 1877 on inheriting the estates of Charles McGarel, his brother-in-law.

Career

He was educated at Eton College and Christ Church, Oxford but left Oxford early without taking his degree to enter the Army and became a Lieutenant-Colonel in the Life Guards, part of the Household Cavalry. On retiring from the Army he went into politics, being elected unopposed as a Conservative MP for Bath in 1865.

He was also a member of St. George, Hanover Square Vestry, a form of local government similar to a parish council. From 1867 he was chosen by the Vestry to represent them on the Metropolitan Board of Works which co-ordinated cross-London building schemes. He was defeated for re-election in Bath in 1868 and concentrated on his work on the Board, and after the death of Sir John Thwaites who had chaired the Board since it was created, he was elected as the new Chairman on 18 November 1870. Hogg was elected MP for Truro in an 1871 byelection and retained that seat until he transferred to Hornsey at the 1885 general election.

His Parliamentary duties made it more difficult for Hogg to be a full-time chairman of the Board. While his predecessor had dismissed staff who he felt were not up to the job, Hogg used his influence to try to keep their jobs safe. Unlike Thwaites, he did not look in detail at the work of the staff but let them get on with their work. This meant that departments within the Board became either very efficient, or very inefficient. The Architects department was particularly noted for inefficiency.

Several of the Board's big schemes were just being completed when McGarel-Hogg's Chairmanship began. The Victoria Embankment had been opened shortly before he was elected, and he got to share in the rewards for the Board's successes, being made a Knight Commander of the Order of the Bath in 1874 when the Chelsea Embankment was opened. Under McGarel-Hogg, the Board bought up all of the bridges over the Thames and freed them of tolls. However, the Board's desire for a new bridge by Little Tower Hill could not be fulfilled because its revenue source was not secure. Tower Bridge was eventually built by the City of London Corporation.

The Board also acquired the power to clear slums in 1875, but found the process cumbersome and expensive, resulting in small progress (although it accelerated when further Acts of Parliament removed some restrictions). Several parks were also bought by the Board and opened to the public. However, McGarel-Hogg's administration was hit by scandal in 1887 over the sale of surplus land, blighting somewhat the award of a peerage in the celebrations of Queen Victoria's Golden Jubilee. A Royal Commission found officers and two members of the Board guilty of malpractice. This resulted in the decision to abolish the Board and replace it with a directly elected council.

Magheramorne had fought for the Board to get permission to build a tunnel at Blackwall and it had been granted in 1887. The tenders for the contract came in early in 1889, when the London County Council had been elected but was not yet in control. He was determined to grant the contract through the Board and resisted the LCC's request that it leave the decision to them; however, when the LCC discovered the Board's intention to seal the contracts, they appealed to the Government and the Board was abolished on 21 March 1889.

Later life
He died in 1890, and is buried in Brompton Cemetery, London.

Personal life
Lord Magheramorne married Caroline Elizabeth Emma Douglas-Pennant, the daughter of The 1st Baron Penrhyn. He died a year after leaving office at the MBW, with his son James inheriting the peerage.

References

External links 
 

Magheramorne, James Macnaghten McGarel, 1st Baron
Magheramorne, James Macnaghten McGarel, 1st Baron
People educated at Eton College
Alumni of Christ Church, Oxford
Members of the Parliament of the United Kingdom for constituencies in Cornwall
Conservative Party (UK) MPs for English constituencies
1
British Life Guards officers
Macgarel Hogg, 1st Baron Magheramorne, James Macnaghten
Politicians from Cornwall
UK MPs 1865–1868
UK MPs 1868–1874
UK MPs 1874–1880
UK MPs 1880–1885
UK MPs 1885–1886
UK MPs 1886–1892
UK MPs who were granted peerages
Burials at Brompton Cemetery
Members of the Metropolitan Board of Works
James
Peers of the United Kingdom created by Queen Victoria